Mark Wallace (born June 1, 1995) is a professional downhill mountain biker from Canada. Wallace began his career at Devinci Global Racing alongside fellow Canadian, Steve Smith.

References

 

1995 births
Living people
Canadian male cyclists
Canadian mountain bikers